HC SKA-Neva is a Russian professional ice hockey team playing in the VHL, the second level of Russian ice hockey. The club was founded as VMF St. Petersburg in 2008 in Saint Petersburg as a farm club of the KHL team SKA Saint Petersburg. After failing to attract the audience in Petersburg, the franchise was relocated to Kondopoga, Karelia during the 2012-2013 VHL season. Starting with the 2013-14 season, the team changed the name to VMF Karelia. On Season 2014-2015, it was changed to SKA-Karelia. In May 2015, the club returned to Saint Petersburg and was renamed SKA-Neva

References

External links
Official site 

Ice hockey teams in Russia
Sport in the Republic of Karelia
Sports clubs in Saint Petersburg